Acer pectinatum is an Asian species of maple that is native to the Himalayas and nearby mountains in southwestern China, Myanmar, and the northeastern part of the Indian Subcontinent. The leaves are non-compound, leathery, up to 10 cm wide and 8 cm across, toothless, usually with 5 lobes but sometimes 3, the lobes toothed along the edges. The leaves of mature trees turn brilliant shades of yellow and orange before falling off in autumn.

Subspecies

 Acer pectinatum subsp. forrestii (Diels) A.E.Murray - Sichuan, Yunnan
 Acer pectinatum subsp. laxiflorum (Pax) A.E.Murray - Sichuan, Yunnan
 Acer pectinatum subsp. maximowiczii (Pax) A.E.Murray  - see Acer maximowiczii 
 Acer pectinatum subsp. pectinatum - Tibet, Yunnan, Bhutan, Assam, Myanmar, Nepal
 Acer pectinatum subsp. taronense (Hub.-Mor.) A.E.Murray - Sichuan, Tibet, Yunnan, Bhutan, Assam, Myanmar

References

External links
 
 line drawing for Flora of China drawing 2 at bottom

pectinatum
Plants described in 1881
Trees of China
Trees of the Indian subcontinent
Trees of Myanmar